Athanasius V (died 1844) was Greek Orthodox Patriarch of Jerusalem (1827 – December 28, 1844). He was born in Edirne.

1844 deaths
People from Edirne
19th-century Greek Orthodox Patriarchs of Jerusalem
1827 births